Sir John Lade, 1st Baronet (1662–1740) was an English brewer and politician who sat in the House of Commons between 1713 and 1727.

Early life

Lade was the fifth but third surviving son of Thomas Lade of Warbleton and his wife Mary Nutt, daughter of John Nutt, DD, of Selmeston, Sussex and was baptized on. 29 May 1662. He became a brewer at Southwark and a member of the Leathersellers Company. He built up a fortune from brewing and invested widely in overseas trading enterprises.

Career
Politically Lade was to start with a strong Jacobite and become involved in local politics on the Tory side as early as 1695. There was a powerful  contingent of Whig brewers  at Southwark, in particular Charles Cox, and Lade decided to challenge them. He stood at the general election at  Southwark in July 1702. Although defeated, he petitioned and the election was declared void. However he did not fare any better in the rerun of the election in  November 1702. He did not stand at the 1705 general election, but Charles Cox and his fellow Whigs launched a campaign to discredit him before the 1708 general election. In March 1709 he  suggested to Henry Sacheverell that he put himself forward for the vacant office of chaplain at St Saviour's, Southwark and after launching a vigorous campaign, Sacheverell was successful. Lade went to St. Paul's to hear Sacheverell deliver a  controversial sermon for which he was later impeached. The campaign at Southwark and the sermon antagonized the Whigs and stirred up Tory support which lead them to victory at the 1710 general election. Lade did not share the triumph as he was defeated at Southwark again. In 1710 he became Master of the Leathersellers’ Company for a year and in 1711 he was appointed  a Commissioner for. taking subscriptions to the South Sea Company. He was an assistant of the. Royal African Company in  1712 and 1713. At the  1713 general election he was elected Member of Parliament for Souhthwark. The election was declared void in April 1714  but he topped the poll in a re-election on 3 May 1714.

Lade was returned unopposed as MP for Southwark at the 1715 general election. By 1719 he was a Governor of  St  Thomas’ Hospital. and was a director of the South Sea Company from 1721 to 1724.  He did not stand at Southwark in 1722 but was returned at a by-election  on  17 January 1724. He did not stand at the  1727 general election. In 1728 he was  Master of the Leathersellers’ Company again for a year. He was created baronet on. 11 March 1731. From 1733 to 1739, he was a director of the South Sea Company again.

Death and legacy
Lade died unmarried on 30 July 1740. He was succeeded in the baronetcy according to remainder by his great nephew, John Whithorne, who took the name of Lade.

References

1662 births
1740 deaths
British MPs 1713–1715
British MPs 1715–1722
British MPs 1722–1727
Members of the Parliament of Great Britain for English constituencies
Baronets in the Baronetage of Great Britain
People from Warbleton